This is a list of battles of the Eighty Years' War.

Introduction

Royalist forces 

Until August 1567, the government of the Habsburg Netherlands, in the hands of Governor-General Margaret of Parma and her Stadtholders, was using local Netherlandish troops, such as schutterijen as city guards. Military law enforcement included the Bandes d'ordonnance, elite heavy cavalry formations drawn mostly from the Flemish (Dutch-speaking) and Walloon (French-speaking) aristocracy. The newly created Army of Flanders arrived in the Low Countries in August 1567 under the command of the Duke of Alba, who immediately carried out substantial military reforms. Alba reduced the prominence of the Bandes d'ordonnance (in part because he distrusted the local nobility) in favour of the well-known Habsburg multi-ethnic infantry regiments, the tercios, alongside Spanish light cavalry (the latter comprised just 8% of the army by 1573). 

Alba introduced Spanish (Castilian) as the language of communication in the Army of Flanders, and Spaniards received higher pay and most of the key positions in his high command. Alba had a low opinion of soldiers from other ethnicities (called "nations") in the tercios, such as Italians, Flemish and Walloons (flamencos or nativos, as the Spaniards called them), and Germans, and preferred relying on Spanish infantrymen, but the actual share of Spanish soldiers in the Army of Flanders – which was at one of the highest totals of the war during Alba's tenure – was a little over 15%. There were also Burgundian, Scottish, Irish, English and Portuguese "nations" at various stages of the war, and intermittently units from other ethnic backgrounds. 

Mutiny due to lack of troop payment was a common problem in the 1570s, which could result in increasing civilian sympathies for the rebel cause (notably the 1576 Sack of Antwerp leading to the Pacification of Ghent), while in the late 1580s and especially 1590s, ethnic tensions between the commanders of the "nations" (such as the Italian Parma, the German Mansfeld and the Spanish Fuentes) led to power struggles that left the Army of Flanders divided and largely paralysed.

Rebel forces 

The rebels, who initiated their first actions of physical force during the Beeldenstorm (August–October 1566, initially mostly directed at Catholic Church property rather than governmental forces) started out as disparate riotous mobs of poorly armed and poorly trained but well-organised Calvinists, originally predominantly from industrial centres in western Flanders. On 14 December 1566, the Habsburg Netherlandish government declared the city of Valenciennes – where Calvinists had seized power – to be "in state of rebellion", and in late December 1566, the first encounter battles occurred between the Habsburg Netherlandish governmental troops and Calvinist rebels. Apart from managing to extend the Siege of Valenciennes (1567) for several months, the Calvinist rebels proved no match for the troops of Margaret of Parma (delegated to stadtholders such as Philip of Noircarmes), who crushed the disturbances in March 1567, before king Philip II sent Alba with the newly formed Army of Flanders from Spain to the Netherlands in April 1567. 

During 1568 and 1572, William "the Silent" of Orange, the wealthiest and most powerful nobleman of the Netherlands, attempted two invasions from his Nassau-Dillenburg stronghold as a 'warlord' with mercenary soldiers organised in typical German fashion (here referred to as "Orangist troops") in opposition to Alba, though both met with little success. Meanwhile in 1572, a mixture of groups of noblemen and common people sympathetic to his cause, or to Calvinism, known as Geuzen, formed paramilitary units that seized control of most of Holland and Zeeland, where Calvinists soon came to dominate politics. Orange functioned as minister of war and commander-in-chief of the Hollandic and Zeelandic troops from 1572 on. It was not until 1575 that these units were merged into the Dutch States Army, organised and directed by the States of Holland and West Friesland and the States of Zeeland (which was illegal; only the king had the right to raise armies). Around the same time, starting in 1574 with the Admiralty of Rotterdam, five Dutch admiralties emerged to organise rebel fleets. 

When faced with large-scale mutinies in the Army of Flanders in 1576 known as the Spanish Fury, Catholic-dominated provinces of the Netherlands such as Brabant and Flanders (authorised by the Council of State in March 1576) also began raising their own armies in self-defence against mutineers, but were unable to prevent the Sack of Antwerp. With the Pacification of Ghent (8 November 1576) all Seventeen Provinces except Luxemburg would agree to expel all foreign troops from the Habsburg Netherlands (essentially restoring the pre-1567 situation) while establishing a temporary general peace of religion. Although this resulted in much ad hoc cooperation between the rebel provinces and the inclusion of units from all of them into the States Army, organisation initially remained mostly provincial and decentralised, and the rebels suffered a catastrophe at the Battle of Gembloux (1578). Most of the rebel territories would go on to create a closer military alliance with the 1579 Union of Utrecht, proclaim independence by the 1581 Act of Abjuration, obtain English support in 1585 and establish the Dutch Republic in 1588, but the 1579–1588 period was marked by a long series of rebel defeats at the hands of Alexander Farnese, Duke of Parma. Effective military reforms of the Dutch States Army were only introduced by Maurice of Nassau in the subsequent Ten Years (1588–1598). By the 1620s, the annual costs of the Dutch States Army were 11,177,087 guilders, 58% of which were paid by Holland as most populous and wealthy province. By the 1630s, Holland increasingly refused to fund land war operations, pleading for greater maritime expenses against the Dunkirker Privateers instead. This led to tensions with stadtholder Frederick Henry, who unsuccessfully sought to merge the five admiralties into one in 1639, and then resumed his focus on financing the land war.

List

See also 
 Anglo–Spanish War (1585–1604)
 Dutch conquest of the Banda Islands (1609–1621)
 Dutch–Portuguese War (1602–1663)
 Franco–Spanish War (1635–1659)
 Succession of Henry IV of France (August 1589 – March 1594), war into which Alexander Farnese, Duke of Parma was sent to intervene in September 1589

References

Bibliography 
 Geyl, Pieter. (1932), The Revolt of the Netherlands, 1555–1609. Williams & Norgate, UK.
  (e-book; original publication 2008; in cooperation with M. Mout and W. Zappey)
 
  [2001] paperback
 
 
 
  (Dissertation)
 

 
Eighty Years' War